Osama Ali Mohammed  (born 25 June 1988) is an Iraqi midfielder who plays with Al-Minaa in Iraq, and for the Iraq national football team.

National team debut
On 27 May 2013, he made his debut for Iraq's national team against Liberia; Iraq lost 1–0.

Honours

Club
Erbil SC
2007–08 Iraqi Premier League: Champion
Al-Zawraa
2010–11 Iraqi Premier League: Champion
Al-Quwa Al-Jawiya
 AFC Cup
2016 Winner
 Iraq FA Cup 
2015–16 Winner
 Iraqi Premier League:
16-17  Winner

International
Iraq national football team
2006 Asian Games Silver medallist

References

External links
Player's profile on Goalzz.com

1988 births
Living people
Iraqi footballers
Iraq international footballers
Association football midfielders
Asian Games medalists in football
Footballers at the 2006 Asian Games
Al-Mina'a SC players
Asian Games silver medalists for Iraq
Medalists at the 2006 Asian Games
AFC Cup winning players